18th Infantry Brigade may refer to:
 18th Infantry Brigade (United Kingdom)
 18th Brigade (Australia)
 18th Indian Infantry Brigade